Hare' Kkaanch Ki Choodiyaan is a Hindi-language television series that aired on the Sahara One channel in 2005. The series premiered on 25 July 2005 and got over on 20 october 2006. The series started airing 3:30pm and was repeated in the 8:30pm slot. The series is produced by Percept Picture Company, and starred Shishir Sharma, Dharmesh Vyas, Rajalaxmi Solanki, Mihir Mishra, Bhumika Seth, Gunjan Vijaya, Krutika Desai Khan, Snigdha Akolkar in her television debut role, and Swapnil Joshi and Rajsingh Verma in the main lead.

Synopsis 
It tells a story of middle-class girl Shyamlee, played by Snigdha Akolkar, and her gradual transformation into a woman of great strength. In her journey through life, Shyamlee faces many hurdles that she overcomes with tremendous grit and determination. She is often a victim of circumstances, but each time she faces the challenge and finally emerges a winner.

Cast 
Dharmesh Vyas – Raghuveer Sharma (Shyamlee's jiju, her elder brother in law, is against love marriage)
Swapnil Joshi – Sunny Joshi
Rajsingh Verma – Male Lead
Shishir Sharma – Mr. Singhania
Snigdha Akolkar – Shyamlee
Addite Shirwaikar – Komal (Ravi's (Sharda's son) girlfriend, wanted to be an actress, but later ended up being married to him)
Rajlaxmi Solanki – Rashmi (Shyamlee's elder sister)
Mihir Mishra – Vikram
Bhumika Seth
Akshay Singh
Sonia
Gunjan Vijaya – Sania (Ravi's sister, Sharda's daughter)
Raj Logani – Apoorva (Mohini's son)
Krutika Desai Khan – Mohini – tarot reader and voodoo specialist
Krutika Desai Khan – Bahati – Wanted to be subscribed to बांसुरी विकृत, a magazine that fueled her desire for woodwind instruments

References 

Sahara One original programming
Indian drama television series
2005 Indian television series debuts